Austerlitz may refer to:

History
 Battle of Austerlitz, an 1805 victory by the French Grand Army of Napoleon Bonaparte

Places
 Austerlitz, German name for Slavkov u Brna in the Czech Republic, which gave its name to the Battle of Austerlitz and is the namesake of other places
 Austerlitz, Netherlands
 Austerlitz, Kentucky, United States
 Austerlitz, New York, United States
 Austerlitz (Oscar, Louisiana), a plantation house listed on the NRHP in Louisiana, US
 Gare d'Austerlitz, railway station in Paris, France

People
 Austerlitz (family), Jewish toponymic surname shared by several unrelated families
 Fred Astaire, born Frederick Austerlitz
 Robert Austerlitz (1923–1994), linguist, specialist in the Proto-Finno-Ugric language

Culture
 Austerlitz (1960 film) directed by Abel Gance
 Austerlitz (2016 film), a documentary film
 Austerlitz (novel) by W. G. Sebald, 2001
 "Austerlitz", a song by The Jezabels on the album Prisoner, 2011
 Austerlitz (video game), a turn-based strategy video game
 Austerlitz (wargame), a 1973 board wargame based on the battle